Ashby Woulds is a civil parish in Leicestershire, England. The population (including Albert Village) at the 2011 census was 3,763.    It is in the North West Leicestershire district, to the west of Ashby de la Zouch.  The main settlements in the parish are Moira and Norris Hill.

Until 1974 the parish was an urban district of Leicestershire.

See also
Ashby Woulds Heritage Trail
Albert Village

References

External links

Districts of England abolished by the Local Government Act 1972
Civil parishes in Leicestershire
North West Leicestershire District